Howellville may refer to:
Howellville, Pennsylvania
Howellville, Texas